Carter Lawrence Larsen is an American classical pianist and composer. Most widely known for his European performances in the 1980s. He is sought after in Hollywood for film scoring and now primarily focuses on piano and orchestra composition.

Early life and education
Larsen was born in San Francisco, California, and began piano studies at the age of six. Composing music in his teens, Larsen graduated from the San Francisco Conservatory of Music, pursuing a dual career as composer and pianist. He studied composition under John Adams and piano under Milton Salkind (Conservatory president) and Mack McCray. Post Conservatory, he worked with Peter Feuchtwanger and Ruth Nye in London, and Vlado Perlemuter (Maurice Ravel's assistant) in Paris.

Musical style and compositions
Larsen is known for creating a new style of 21st-century romanticism which combines 19th-century romanticism with influences of the 20th century, such as jazz, minimalism and world music. His group of compositions, Fantasia Suite, is seen as a Neo-Romantic reaction to the violence and dissonance of the last century, emphasizing beauty and fantasy with idealism at its foundation.

He composed more than 300 substantial piano and orchestra works in Fantasia Suite , The Cosmos Symphonic Suite and Symphonies on The Lake establishes Larsen as one of today's most prolific piano composers. These compositions represent a continuous cycle of cinematic, yet classically written music in a bold, new contemporary idiom. Andrea Van de Kamp, Chairman Emeritus of the Music Center in Los Angeles, declares, “Fantasia Suite is the music of the future. Larsen is creating a breakthrough with his twenty-first century Neo-Romantic approach. He has embraced the summation of our classical culture in music, while exploding into another dimension of creativity.” Scott Epstein insists, “Larsen composes music for our age that is personal, deeply felt and sophisticated. Resisting conventional labels, his music pursues its own path with intense inspiration. It reaches us and reflects us. Larsen is a composer for out times.”

In Larsen's compositions, the melody, harmony, rhythm and instrumental virtuosity attains a level of complexity that is richly satisfying. Larsen's approach to the piano, though modern and individual, has its antecedents in the pianism of the great classical and romantic composers. The music is sometimes vocal, sometimes orchestral and sometimes peculiarly pianistic in figuration. The forms are clear and accessible and the music is always at the service of the emotional content, whether serious or capricious, bitter or sweet, worldly or spiritual.

Performances and appearances
Starting in 1980, Larsen became renowned in Europe for his piano performances of the High Romantics. In particular, his interpretations of Liszt, Grieg, Rachmaninoff and Saint-Saëns made significant contributions to the Romantic Revival and won acclaim from both audiences and critics.

Carter Larsen conducted and performed as soloist with major concerts including the Royal Philharmonic Orchestra and the London Symphony Orchestra. His featured presentation in London performing Chopin's music, was broadcast on BBC television's prestigious "Omnibus " program in 1986.

Renowned for several world premieres and recordings of previously unknown works of Liszt and Saint-Saëns, Larsen became the first pianist to make a complete CD recording of Saint-Saëns' solo piano music in 1989.

Larsen established himself as a composer premiering four original compositions alongside the classics, which were first broadcast on the UK's Classic FM "Platform Live" in 1994.

He also served as conductor in the 70th Academy Awards.

Further expanding his musical influence, in 2010 Larsen was invited to perform during the Shanghai Expo 2010, at the Shanghai Grand Theatre June 21, the closing night of the International Film Festival and the Shanghai Music Festival. Larsen performed the classics, original compositions, and improvisations. It was the first time CNN had interviewed an artist for the Grand Theatre. The concert was covered by two television stations broadcasting to a total estimated audience of 500 million and included the Shanghai International Channel and the Shanghai Arts Channel filming a documentary of the concert.

Larsen's Volumes

Larsen has, since 1973, written more than 240 piano and orchestra works in Fantasia Suite and The Cosmos Symphonic Suite, available in a complete collection of 29 volumes and as individual books.

Volume I – ARCADIA – Solo Piano 
Volume II – NEXUS – Solo Piano
Volume III – EMERANCE – Solo Piano
Volume IV – ODYSSEY – Solo Piano
Volume V – KALIDA – Solo Piano
Volume VI – ALTURAS – Solo Piano
Volume X – BRIDGES AND BEYOND – Piano and Orchestra
Volume XI – LEGENDS OF THE COSMOS – Piano and Orchestra
Volume XII – DIVINATION – Piano and Orchestra 
Volume XIII – FANTASIAS – Piano and Orchestra
Volume Xa – BRIDGES AND BEYOND – Two Pianos 
Volume XIa – LEGENDS OF THE COSMOS – Two Pianos 
Volume XIIa – DIVINATION – Two Pianos 
Volume XIIIa – FANTASIAS – Two Pianos
Volume XV – FAROS – Orchestra
Volume XVI – REISCHEN – Orchestra
Volume XVII – PARSCHADA – Orchestra
Volume XVIII – VIAMALA – Orchestra
Volume XIX – ZILLIS – Orchestra
Volume XX – STARLERA – Orchestra
Volume XXI – RHEINWALD – Orchestra
Volume XXII – AVERS – Orchestra
Volume XXIII – WERGENSTEIN – Orchestra
Volume XXIV – CRESTA – Orchestra
Volume XXV – MADRISCH – Orchestra
Volume XXVI – BARENBURG – Orchestra

Music in film
Larsen has written film and television scores, writing music for major Hollywood studios. He was asked to compose music for various films, including Paramount's Star Trek to Nosferatu along with Masterpiece Theatre and The Mark of Zorro. Larsen's films, "Innocents Mission" and Love Bytes, premiered at the Sundance Film Festival, and his feature Big Shots premiered at the Cannes Film Festival.

Larsen is currently scoring Martin Scorsese’s new film Something to Believe In, as well as creating his most ambitious work thus far, the Fantasia Suite.

List of compositions

Fantasia Suite
Arcadia 
Flight, Op. 7 
Reverence, Op. 36 
Lumiere, Op. 28
Soliloquy, Op. 10
Bridges, Op. 3
Elegie, Op. 1
Brunella, Op. 22
Someday, Op. 2
Celebration, Op. 21
Spirit of Auriel, Op. 18
Seagulls of Capri, Op. 5
Gypsy’s Waltz, Op. 13
Carousel, Op. 25
Eternal Rhapsodie, Op. 4
Nexus
Ethereal Nights, Op. 6
Innocence, Op. 17
Raging Light, Op. 33
Solstice, Op. 12
Circus Waltz, Op. 31
Dernier Voyage, Op. 37
Dragonfly, Op. 46
Moonlit Nostalgia, Op. 26
Spinato, Op. 68
Esprit, Op. 38
Lament, Op. 8
Mass Ascension Op. 9
Emerance
Seacliff, Op. 27
Elysia, Op. 29
Cirrus, Op. 11
To the Wind, Op. 41
The Game, Op. 67
Leonora, Op. 42
Spectrum of Triumph, Op. 16
Dimanche, Op. 32
Mercurious, Op. 73
Santorini Op. 35
Odyssey
Sirens in Trancoso Op. 62
Tale of Velasco Op. 72
Iris Op. 107
Call Of Asturias Op. 66
Realization Op. 63
Firestorm Op. 69
Prophecy Op. 49
Delphi Crystals Op. 79
Esaltante Op. 105
Euphoric Odyssey Op. 45
Reminiscence Op. 20
Ratanga Op. 61
The Gift Op. 14
Enrique’s Song Op. 59
Lance of Soleris Op. 95
March To The Cosmos Op. 44
Kalida
Sapphire Op. 47
Reflect Op. 48
Amore E Destino Op. 34
Kai Op. 19
Folletta Op. 75
Spectre Op. 40
Valse Pensif Op. 51
Alexei’s Mission Op. 86
The Vision Op. 30
Scherzana Op. 52
Rainbow Op. 24
Mirage Op. 15
Alturas
The Story of Glory Op. 126
Fate Op. 114
Fly with Me Op.127
Walls Of Troy Op. 14
Solemnity Op. 132
Celeste Op. 64
Passion Op. 118
Harp Whispers Op. 135
Resurrection Op. 122 
Forest Mist Op. 124
Eternal Love Op. 140
Zampilli Op. 117 
Azure Op. 98 
Luna Romantica Op. 139
Danza Triste Op. 134
Sweet Sorrow Op. 121
Silence Of Love Op. 101
Dream Of Verona Op. 43
Fall River Op. 138
Innocence Op. 136
Full Sail Op. 148
Scarecrow Op. 149
Window to Kaja Op. 143
The Nomad Op. 142
Love At Sunset Op. 131
Lago Misterioso Op. 133
Land Of The Free Op. 130
Crystal Heart Op. 23
Bridges and Beyond
Bridges Op. 148
Gipsy's Waltz Op. 149
Elegie Op. 150
Eternal Rhapsodie Op. 151
Legends of the Cosmos
Lemuria Op. 152
Pyramids Of Atlantis Op. 153
The Gift Op. 154
Twilight Of Sitara Op. 155
Divination
Spring Vision Op. 77
Transcendence Op. 78
The Maverick Op. 79
Dawn Of Freedom Op. 80
Fantasias
Ethereal Nights Op. 156
Solstice Op. 157
Spectrums of Triumph Op. 158
The Cosmos Symphonic Suite
Faros 
Artasia Op. 233
Heimdall’s Ruins Op. 227
Of Hope and Sorrow Op. 197
Circles Of Time Op. 173
Silent Gates Op. 210
Columns Of The Universe Op. 175
Reischen 
Rohllor Op. 198
Statues Of Dust Op. 223
Silver Wizard Op. 208
The Golden Cathedral Op. 217
Swords Of Fire Op. 222
Parschada 
Divinity And Phantasos Op. 199
The Sacret Stone Op. 220
Cosmic Juggler Op. 207
Ascension Op. 185
Gates Of Paradise Op. 228
Viamala
Arcasius Op. 232
Terror Of Ragnus Op. 224
Angels and Death Op. 212
Twisted Velocity Op. 204
Call Of The Warriors Op. 181
Zillis
Hillor Op. 203
Cristal Prophecy Op. 201
Volsina And The Harlequin Op. 215
Ephifany of Ersani Op. 205
Storms and Zephira Op. 174
Starlera
Balderia Op. 192
The Secret Veil Op. 206
Freya And The Kaleidoscope Op. 182
The Hour Glass Op. 202
Angel Warriors Op. 184
Rheinvald
Eyron Op. 172
Transmigration Op. 226
March Of The Kingdom Op. 186
Sky Whispers Op. 209
Archillusion Op. 231
Force Of Destiny Op. 191
Avers
Thorus Op. 190
Wizard And The Spyglass Op. 193
Aurora Borealis Op. 211
Echos From The Galaxy Op. 176
View From Above Op. 179
Wergenstein
Splendor Of Arasma Op. 213
Rainbow Messanger Op. 219
Astral Voices Op. 187
Celestial Jokers Op. 229
The Abyss Of Tharsis Op. 178
Return Of The Kings Op. 189
Cresta
Uuniverse Of Esoss Op. 218
Tears And Sifius Op. 214
The Illusionist Op. 221
Voices Of Time Op. 183
Warriors In White Op. 180
Madrisch
Andalos Op. 188
Salina And The Conquistador Op. 177
Myth Of Kratos Op. 225
Spanish Masquerade Op. 216
Zodiac Fiesta Op. 171
Bärenburg
Heralon Op. 200
Wisdom Of Omega Op. 195
Terina’s Castle Op. 230
Eternal Reflection Op. 194
Skydust Op. 196
Final Triumph Op. 170
Symphonies on The Lake 
Stresa
Isola Bella
Laveno
Pallanza
Lesa
Isola Madre
Arona
Santa Caterina
Feriolo
Angera
Isola dei Pescatori
Belgirate

Recordings
Film Scoring for Piano and Orchestra
Scoring Selections
Music for Piano – Camille Saint-Saëns
Original Music for Film and Television
Romantic Rarities – Solo Piano, CD and Vinyl – 1984
Solo Saint-Saëns – Solo Piano – 1989
Melodic Montage -1999
Fantasia Suite I
Fantasia Suite II
Live at St. Martins In The Fields – Solo Piano – 2010
Carter Larsen Fantasia Suite – Solo Piano, Double Pack – 2010
Live Improvisation on Bach – Solo Piano – 2010
Fantasia Suite for Piano and Orchestra – 2017
Bridges & Beyond – Fantasias – Piano & Orchestra – 2018
Legends of The Cosmos – Piano & Orchestra – 2018
Divination – Piano & Orchestra – 2018
The Cosmos Symphonic Suite – 12 CD's - Piano & Orchestra – 2021

Film Soundtracks
The Healing Chamber - 2002 directed by Peter Dixon Discovery Channel
Something to Believe In - 2003 directed by Bonnie Palef produced by Martin Scorsese
Star Trek: First Contact -1996 Paramount Studio
Mark Of Zorro - 2002 Original Silent
World War III - 2000 Fox Studios
Impressions - 1994 directed by Bruce Manning
Big Shots - 2001 premiered at Cannes Film Festival
Awakening Elegie - 2003 Music Video PBS
Pierced Heart - 1996 Prophecy Films
Innocents Mission - 2001 directed by Eric Tetrault 
Love Bytes - 2001 premiered at Sundance Film Festival
Cannons and Flowers - 1996 BBC Documentary about Chopin and Poland
Appassionato - Music Video
Widow in White - 1997 directed by John Guillerman
Scarecrow - 1995 Red Rocks Productions
Fall River - 1999 Backstage Door Production
Good bye America - 1996 Quantum Entertainment

References

External links 
 
 
 Carter Larsen Foundation on YouTube

Living people
American male composers
21st-century American composers
American male pianists
21st-century American pianists
21st-century American male musicians
Year of birth missing (living people)